Harallamb Qaqi (born 17 September 1993) is an Albanian professional footballer who plays as a centre-back for Kategoria Superiore club Teuta.

Club career

Early career
Kiakis started his youth career at AEK Athens, played some years and in 2012 he moved to Varese, where he stayed for a year.

Verona
On 26 July 2013 he moved to Hellas Verona and quickly loaned to Carpi until the end of the 2013–14 season.

Carpi (on loan)
He included in the first team of Carpi for the match against Ternana, played on 24 August 2013 where Kiakis was an unused substitute for the entire match, which finished in the 1–0 loss.

He made it his first professional debut with Carpi on 30 May 2014 in the closing match of the 2013–14 Serie B against Juve Stabia by coming on as a substitute in the 90+1' minute in place of Roberto Inglese, the scorer of the opening goal of the match which finished as a 0–2 victory in the end.

Barleta (on loan)
He loaned out to Barletta in Lega Pro Prima Divisione for the 2014–15 season. He made it his debut on 1 November 2014 by playing as a starter and finishing the full 90-minutes match between Barletta and Paganese which finished as a 2–1 loss where Kiakis scored an own-goal in the 83rd minute.

Alki Oroklini
On 30 August 2019, Qaqi joined Cypriot club Alki Oroklini.

International career
He started his international career with the youth national team Albania U-19, where he first called up in the team to participate in the 2012 UEFA European Under-19 Championship qualification, playing his first match on 5 October 2011 as the starter against Denmark U-19, where he substituted off in the 72nd minute and the match finished in the loss 1–0 with an later goal of Denmark U-19 scored in the 90+3rd minute. He played two days later in the next fixture match against Austria U-19, where he included again in the starting line up and received a yellow card in the 64th minute, then the second yellow card in the 71st so he was sent off, and the match finished in a goalless draw 0–0.

After being played for Albania U-19, Kiakis received an call-up by the coach Skënder Gega for the Albania national under-21 football team fixture matches against Hungary U-21 and Bosnia and Herzegovina U-21 respectively on 7 and 11 June 2013, valids for the 2015 UEFA European Under-21 Football Championship qualification. He was an unused substitute for the first match against Hungary U-21, which finished in the 1–2 loss. He made it his debut in the fixture match against Bosnia and Herzegovina U-21 on 11 June 2013, as he included in the starting line up then substituted off for the start of the second half, as the match finished in the 4–1 loss.

Career statistics

Club

References

External links

Profile - FSHF

1993 births
Living people
Footballers from Tirana
Albanian footballers
Association football central defenders
Albania youth international footballers
Albania under-21 international footballers
Hellas Verona F.C. players
A.C. Carpi players
A.S.D. Barletta 1922 players
FK Partizani Tirana players
KF Laçi players
FK Kukësi players
FC Kamza players
Alki Oroklini players
KF Drenica players
KF Skënderbeu Korçë players
Serie B players
Kategoria e Dytë players
Kategoria Superiore players
Albanian expatriate footballers
Albanian expatriate sportspeople in Italy
Albanian expatriate sportspeople in Greece
Albanian expatriate sportspeople in Cyprus
Expatriate footballers in Italy
Expatriate footballers in Greece
Expatriate footballers in Cyprus